The Edge of Tomorrow or Edge of Tomorrow may refer to:

 Edge of Tomorrow, originally All You Need Is Kill, a 2004 novel by Hiroshi Sakurazaka 
 Edge of Tomorrow, a 2014 science fiction film based on the book
 The Edge of Tomorrow (Asimov book), a 1985 collection by Isaac Asimov
 The Edge of Tomorrow (Dooley book), a 1958 book by Thomas A. Dooley
 Edge of Tomorrow, a fictional TV series in the sitcom Hot in Cleveland
 The Edge of Tomorrow, a 1961 short story collection by Howard Fast

See also
 Edge of Tomorty: Rick Die Rickpeat, a 2019 episode of the television series Rick and Morty